Runica is a village in the Lipkovo municipality, in North Macedonia. In the Middle Ages, there was a village called Rućinci, which was one of the villages granted (metochion) by sevastokrator Dejan (fl. 1346-1366) to the Arhiljevica.

History
Descendants of the Krasniqi fis were recorded in the villages of Gošince, Slupčane, Alaševce and Runica in 1965.

Demographics
According to the 2002 census, the village had a total of 69 inhabitants. Ethnic groups in the village include:

Albanians 69

References

External links

Villages in Lipkovo Municipality
Albanian communities in North Macedonia